Monstruncusarctia is a genus of moths in the family Erebidae from the Afrotropics.

Species
 Monstruncusarctia aurantiaca (Holland, 1893)
 Monstruncusarctia decemmaculata  (Rothschild, 1916)

References
 , 2008: Reviewing the African tiger-moth genera. 1. New genera from the late Prof. V. S. Murzin's collection (Lepidoptera, Arctiidae). Atalanta 39 (1/4): 356-366, 20 figs., pl. 15.
Natural History Museum Lepidoptera generic names catalog

Spilosomina
Moth genera